The Jester's Supper (Italian: La cena delle beffe) is a 1942 Italian historical film directed by Alessandro Blasetti and starring Amedeo Nazzari, Osvaldo Valenti and Clara Calamai. It was based on a play of the same title by Sem Benelli, which had later been turned into an opera by Umberto Giordano. Like the play, the film is set in the 15th century Florence of Lorenzo the Magnificent and portrays a rivalry that leads to a series of increasingly violent practical jokes.

Production and reception
It was shot at Cinecittà in Rome partly using sets which had been constructed for Blasetti's earlier The Iron Crown which was set in the same era. Amedeo Nazzari, the leading Italian star of the decade, was cast strongly against type. Usually Nazzari played romantic heroes or action men, but in the film he plays a loutish character and appeared without his trademark moustache. A popular catchphrase associated with Nazzari originated in the film: "a plague on anyone who refuses to drink with me!"

The film was extremely popular and boosted the career of Clara Calamai in particular. In one scene her dress is ripped off by Nazzari, briefly exposing her breasts in one of the first topless scenes in Italian cinema. It was one of several films in which Osvaldo Valenti and Luisa Ferida, later executed in 1945, appeared together.

Cast

References

Bibliography 
Gundle, Stephen. Mussolini's Dream Factory: Film Stardom in Fascist Italy. Berghahn Books, 2013.
 Moliterno, Gino. The A to Z of Italian Cinema. Scarecrow Press, 2009.

External links 

1942 films
Italian historical drama films
Italian black-and-white films
1940s historical drama films
1940s Italian-language films
Films directed by Alessandro Blasetti
Films set in the 15th century
Films set in Florence
Italian films based on plays
Films shot at Cinecittà Studios
1942 drama films
1940s Italian films